"A Report to an Academy" (German: "Ein Bericht für eine Akademie") is a short story by Franz Kafka, written and published in 1917. In the story, an ape named Red Peter, who has learned to behave like a human, presents to an academy the story of how he effected his transformation. The story was first published by Martin Buber in the German monthly Der Jude, along with another of Kafka's stories, "Jackals and Arabs" ("Schakale und Araber"). The story appeared again in a 1919 collection titled Ein Landarzt (A Country Doctor).

Plot
The narrator, speaking before a scientific conference, describes his former life as an ape. His story begins in a West African jungle, in which a hunting expedition shoots and captures him. Caged on a ship for his voyage to Europe, he finds himself for the first time without the freedom to move as he will. Needing to escape from this situation, he studies the habits of the crew, and imitates them with surprising ease; he reports encountering particular difficulty only in learning to drink alcohol. Throughout the story, the narrator reiterates that he learned his human behavior not out of any desire to be human, but only to provide himself with a means of escape from his cage.

Upon arriving in Europe, the ape realizes that he is faced with a choice between "the Zoological Garden or the Music Hall," and devotes himself to becoming human enough to become an able performer. He accomplishes this, with the help of many teachers, and reports to the academy that his transformation is so complete that he can no longer properly describe his emotions and experiences as an ape. In concluding, the ape expresses a degree of satisfaction with his lot.

Analysis
Walter Herbert Sokel has suggested that the story speaks to a conflict "between internal and external continuity in the ape's existence".  The preservation of the life of the protagonist is dependent upon his casting off memory and identity; only by achieving the end of that internal identity could actual biological life be maintained. Thus, for the ape, "identity is performance"; "It is not a static essence, a given, but a constantly reenacted self-representation."

The motif of the changeability of identity may have ramifications in the context of Zionism and the Jewish diaspora, as "A Report to an Academy" first appeared in a Zionist magazine. Nicholas Murray briefly suggests in his 2004 biography of Kafka that the story is a satirization of Jews' assimilation into Western culture.

The story's references to the protagonist's "apish past" ("äffisches Vorleben") have led some literary theorists to associate the story with evolutionary theory.

In J.M. Coetzee's novel Elizabeth Costello, the title character gives a central place to "A Report to an Academy" in her speech about vegetarianism and animal rights. She also suggests that Kafka may have been influenced by German psychologist Wolfgang Köhler's The Mentality of Apes, also published in 1917. However, historian Gregory Radick suggests that a more likely inspiration for Kafka was the work of the American psychologist Lightner Witmer. In 1909 Witmer staged a widely publicized test of the mental abilities of a vaudeville chimp named Peter. This test, conducted in front of a panel of scientists, included a demonstration of Peter's ability to say several words, including "momma."

Adaptations
Mexican actor Humberto Dupeyron has performed this play under the title "The Gorilla".

An adaptation was broadcast by the BBC on 7 December 1969 under Thirty-Minute Theatre.

In 1987 South African actor Marius Weyers performed an adaptation to rave reviews in Los Angeles. Critics noted the parallels with apartheid race science.

In 1989 the monologuist and writer Andrew Tansey adapted and premiered The Greatest Ape, an adaptation of Kafka's story, at the Edinburgh International Festival, before touring the USA and UK. The critically acclaimed production was directed by Paul Dodwell.

In 2009, a theatrical adaptation of Kafka's story by Colin Teevan opened at the Young Vic in London. The hour-long solo piece was directed by Walter Meierjohann, and Kathryn Hunter's performance as Red Peter the ape was widely acclaimed. In 2013 the play was set up at the Baryshnikov Arts Center.

The 2001 film Human Nature, written by Charlie Kaufman, is a loose adaptation of Kafka's short story.

In 2013, the short story was staged in Montreal under the name of Kafka's Ape, presented by independent theater company Infinitheatre. Guy Sprung directed actor Howard Rosenstein in the role of Red Peter.

In the 2014 story collection Only the Animals by Ceridwen Dovey,  the short story Red Peter's Little Lady (Soul of Chimpanzee) uses A Report to an Academy as the jumping off point for her tale of a dead chimpanzee who recounts his experiences as an animal trained to act human.

References

External links 

 Full English text of "A Report to an Academy"
 

Short stories by Franz Kafka
1917 short stories
Fictional apes
Short stories adapted into films